Lino Martschini (born 21 January 1993) is a Swiss professional ice hockey forward for EV Zug of the National League (NL) and the Swiss national team. He played his junior hockey for the Peterborough Petes of the Ontario Hockey League (OHL).

Playing career

Junior
Prior to coming to Peterborough, Ontario, to play for the Peterborough Petes, Martschini was a successful player with many teams in Zug, playing in Top Mini, Elite Novizen, Elite Jr. A, and Top Junioren leagues with teams varying from under-15 to under-20. He also represented his country, Switzerland, in various junior world championships, before being drafted in the 2010 CHL Import Draft by the Petes.

When he arrived in the OHL for the 2010–11 season, Martschini was a top player for the Petes, notching 20 goals and 38 assists for a total of 58 points in 61 games, just shy of a point-per-game. He had only 12 penalty minutes, but was a -35. He was one of the Petes' top players and put out an excellent showing as a rookie on a team that boasted players like Matt Puempel and Ryan Spooner. Both were selected in the 2011 NHL Entry Draft, by the Ottawa Senators and Boston Bruins, respectively, but Martschini was passed over.

He returned to Peterborough for 2011–12. Playing in 63 games as a 19-year-old, he notched 21 goals and 35 assists for 56 points, along with eight penalty minutes and a -13. This would be his last year playing in the OHL.

Professional
Martschini left for his native country to play for EV Zug in the National League A, for the 2012–13. He played well in his limited time (39 games), putting up 17 goals and 13 assists for a total of 30 points. He had only 4 penalty minutes and was a +5 rating, for an excellent rookie season.

In the 2013–14, Martschini played more games, but was only able to score 27 points in 50 games (15 goals, 12 assists) in his sophomore year, with just two penalty minutes and a +3.

Prior to the 2015–16 season, Martschini agreed to a four-year contract extension with EV Zug worth CHF 2.5 million. At the end of the 2015-16 season, he was selected to play in the 2016 World Championship with the Swiss national team. He played 4 of the team's 7 games, tallying only 1 assist.

On 23 August 2019 Martschini was signed to an early three-year contract extension by Zug worth CHF 2.175 million through the 2022/23 season.

Career statistics

Regular season and playoffs

International

Personal Life
Lino is married to Cynthia Shaw since 2016. They share two kids.

References

External links
 

1993 births
Living people
Peterborough Petes (ice hockey) players
Swiss ice hockey right wingers
EV Zug players
Sportspeople from Lucerne